The Compact Disk Dummies is a Belgian electropunk band from Desselgem (Waregem). The group consists of the brothers Lennert (born in 1993) and Janus Coorevits (born in 1995). Both do the vocals and play keyboards, Lennert also plays the guitar.

History 
The group was founded in 2010 and in the same year they won the Music Live event, and ended second at the Belgian edition of the Kunstbende. Their musical breakthrough came when the two brothers won Humo's Rock Rally as teenagers in 2012, in the Ancienne Belgique. They ended before groups as Geppetto & The Whales to become the successors of School is Cool.

In March 2013 they brought out their first EP "Mess with Us", together with their first single "The Reeling". The title temporarily reached the top of Studio Brussel's De Afrekening list on 27 April 2013, and stood in the Flemish Ultratop 50 during six weeks. In the summer of 2013 they featured in festivals like the Lokerse Feesten and Pukkelpop.

On 6 May 2016, the band released their debut album Silver Souls.

Discography

Albums 
Silver Souls (2016)
Neon Fever Dream (2020)

Extended plays 
 Mess with Us (2013)
 Satellites (2019)

Singles

References

External links
 

Belgian rock music groups
Musical groups established in 2010
Rock music duos
Electropunk musical groups
PIAS Recordings artists
2010 establishments in Belgium
Belgian electronic music groups